Milecastle 3 (Ouseburn) was a milecastle of the Roman Hadrian's Wall.  No remains exist, but it was thought to have been located at the junction of the A187 Byker Bridge and Stephen Street.

Construction 
No evidence exists as to the configuration or type of Milecastle 3, though the curtain wall at this stage was almost certainly a narrow configuration.

Excavations and investigations
1732 - Horsley surveyed the milecastle, recording its position.

1776 - The location was visited by Stukeley, who sketched the area for his ''Iter Boreale'.

1789 - Brand visited the site, but noted that many of the stones had been removed from the foundations some years previously, for use in the building of an adjoining house.

1848 - Collingwood Briuce reported that a small, partly illegible altar had been found close to the presumed site of the milecastle.  The altar (NMR Number: NZ 26 SE 227) was dedicated by Julius Maximus.  Having searched the area, he could find no trace of Roman remains.
1858 - Henry MacLauchlan surveyed the area but reported no dependable trace of the milecastle.
1979 - Exploratory trenches were sunk during the building of the Metro, revealing no trace of the milecastle.

Associated turrets 
Each milecastle on Hadrian's Wall had two associated turret structures.  These turrets were positioned approximately one-third and two-thirds of a Roman mile to the west of the Milecastle, and would probably have been manned by part of the milecastle's garrison.  The turrets associated with Milecastle 3 are known as Turret 3A and Turret 3B.

Turret 3A
Excavations found the walls of the turret in addition to a ditch and six obstacle pits. Turret 3A became the most easterly known turret on the wall. The interior of the turret is thought to have been truncated by late 19th or early 20th century construction work. A Roman tegula tile was recovered, suggesting that the turret may have had a tiled roof.

Turret 3B
Nothing is known of Turret 3B.

Presumed location:

Monument records

References

Bibliography

03